Piotr Giro (born Piotr Torazawa Giro; January 16, 1974) is a Swedish freelance actor, dancer and choreographer.
Giro was born in Wałbrzych, Poland and moved with his mother to Sweden at the age of seven.
In 1993 he began training at the Royal Swedish Ballet school in Stockholm, 1996 he joined the Batsheva dance company based in
Tel Aviv, Israel led by artistic director Ohad Naharin. In 1998 he joined the Ultima Vez dance company led by Wim Vandekeybus based in
Brussels, Belgium.
Ultima Vez and Wim Vandekeybus has launched the company into a new stage. The company is made up of individually unique dancers and actors
from Belgium and abroad.
Giro has worked as an actor at the Royal Dramatic Theatre in Stockholm, Gothenburg Municipal Theatre and Stockholm Municipal Theatre.

Filmography
 2009 - Mannen under trappan
 2009 - Olof 1440 min
 2007 - The Blueberry War
 2006 - Keillers Park
 2006 - Wellkåmm to Verona
 2004 - Graveyard Iland
 2003 - Five Staircases
 2003 - Skeppsholmen
 2002 - Mantra
 2001 - In Spite of Wishing and Wanting
 2000 - Inasmuch
 1999 - The last words

Theatrework
 2009 - Unknown Pleasures dancetheatre Putervik and Kulturhuset in Stockholm, Sweden 2009, touring in Sweden 2010, 2011)
 2008 - King Edward The Second  by Christopher Marlowe Unga Klara / Stockholm Municipaltheatre
 2006 - Momo, also known as The Grey Gentlmen or The Men in Grey by Michael Ende Skärholmen / Stockholm Municipaltheatre
 2005 - As Don Juan, Don Juan by Molière Gothenburg Municipaltheatre
 2004 - The Divine Comedy By Dante Alighieri rewritten by Niklas Rådström Ghothenburg Municipaltheatre
 2003 - As Romeo, Romeo & Juliet by William Shakespeare  Royal Dramatic Theatre, Stockholm, Sweden

Dancework
 2010 - Equal (Shintaro Oue, Piotr Giro, Satoshi Kudo)
 2008 - Triptych (Örjan Andersson)
 2008 - Spiegel (Ultima Vez/Wim Vandekeybus)
 2000 - Inasmuch as Life is borrowed (Ultima Vez/Wim Vandekeybus
 2001 - In Spite of Wishing and Wanting (Ultima Vez/Wim Vandekeybus)
 2000 - L'Anatomie du fauve (Josef Nadj)
 1997 - Batsheva Dance Ensemble/Ohad Naharin/Batsheva Dance Company
 1997 - Deuce (Carl-Olof Berg) A Project in April 1997
 1998 - ÄETT (Carl-Olof Berg) A Project in April 1998
 1998 - Norrdans (Jens Östberg, Jo Strømgren)  guest performer

References

External links
 
 Reich-szyber.com
 Piotr Giro at Youtube
 Piotr Giro at Youtube
 Ultima vez web site
 Josefnadj.com
 Batsheva dance company web site
 Dansalliansen.se
 Ifilm.nu
 Angelin Preljocaj web site

Swedish choreographers
Polish emigrants to Sweden
Polish people of Japanese descent
Swedish people of Japanese descent
Swedish people of Polish descent
Living people
Year of birth missing (living people)